Francis Cornelius Chivers (7 April 1909 – 2 April 1942) was a professional footballer, who played for Barnsley, Huddersfield Town and Blackburn Rovers.

He was killed in a mining accident in April 1942.

References

1909 births
1942 deaths
People from Forest of Dean District
English footballers
Association football forwards
English Football League players
Barnsley F.C. players
Huddersfield Town A.F.C. players
Blackburn Rovers F.C. players
Huddersfield Town A.F.C. wartime guest players
Sportspeople from Gloucestershire
Industrial accident deaths
Accidental deaths in England